Slipped into Tomorrow is the fifth solo album by John Norum, the guitarist for Swedish hard rock band Europe, released in 1999.

The album features a cover version of the Thin Lizzy song "Killer Without a Cause".

Track listing
"Still in the Game" (John Norum, Billy White) - 3:49
"Waiting on You" (Norum) - 3:32
"Blackscape" (Norum, Fredrik Åkesson) - 5:14
"Tico's Life" (Norum) - 4:58
"Nobody Answers" (Norum) - 4:53
"Losing My Mind" (Norum) - 6:12
"Freedom Is My Truth" (Norum) - 4:19
"Veda" (Norum, Michelle Meldrum) - 4:42
"Songs of Yesterday" (Norum, Meldrum) - 4:44
"Killer Without a Cause" (Scott Gorham, Phil Lynott) - 4:06
"Center of Balance" (Live) (Norum, Kelly Keeling, Peter Baltes, Simon Wright) - 6:26

Personnel
John Norum - lead vocals, guitars
Stefan Rodin - bass guitar
Mats Olausson - keyboards
Thomas Broman - drums
Leif Sundin - lead vocals on "Center of Balance"
Mats Levén - backing vocals

Album credits
John Norum - producer

John Norum albums
1999 albums